Sphodros paisano is a species of purseweb spider in the family Atypidae. It is found in the United States and Mexico.

References

Atypidae
Articles created by Qbugbot
Spiders described in 1980